David Olson Ulrich (born 1953) is a university professor, author, speaker, management coach, and management consultant. Ulrich is a professor of business at the Ross School of Business, University of Michigan and co-founder of The RBL Group. With his colleagues, he has written over 30 books that have shaped the HR profession, defined organizations as capabilities, and  shown the impact of leadership on customers and investors. Ulrich served on the Board of Directors for Herman Miller for 17 years, is a Fellow in the National Academy of Human Resources, and served on the Board of Trustees of Southern Virginia University for 9 years.

Dave Ulrich has been ranked the #1 Management Educator & Guru by BusinessWeek, selected by Fast Company as one of the 10 most innovative and creative leaders, is one of 21 people in the Thinker's Fifty Hall of Fame, and named the most influential thinker in HR of the decade by HR magazine.

Early life and work
Ulrich was born in the small town of Ely, Nevada, but grew up in Oregon. His father worked as a forester building campgrounds, then transferred in order to direct social programs for Job Corps. His mother spent time in church and community service.  From his parents, he learned the importance of service and the value of hard work.  The Ulrich family lived subsequently in Kansas City, Missouri, where he attended high school.

Ulrich attended Brigham Young University where he completed his undergraduate degree in University Studies in five semesters and began graduate school in Organizational Behavior.  He earned a PhD in Business (Organization Theory) from the University of California, Los Angeles. He was awarded Honorary Doctorate from Abertay University, Dundee Scotland.  He also received an honorary doctorate from Utah Valley University in 2020.

Research and career
Dave Ulrich’s professional focus has addressed questions on how organizations add value to customers and investors through both talent, leadership, organization, and human resource practices. In the human resource area, he and his colleagues have worked to redefine and upgrade HR. With his colleagues, Ulrich has articulated how the modern HR organization can be organized into shared services, centers of expertise, and business partners. He has also co-directed research on over 125,000 respondents about the competencies required for successful HR professionals; in addition, he has helped shape thinking on how to transform HR practices so that they are aligned to customer needs and integrated around organization capabilities. In the leadership area, Norm Smallwood and Ulrich have worked to focus on the outcomes of effective leadership; they have also shown how leadership will increase customer share by creating a leadership brand within the company. Their work also illustrates that investing in leadership will increase shareholder value. Their work also synthesizes the thicket of leadership competency models into a unified view of leadership. Their current work attempts to look at leadership through the eyes and expectations of investors.. Dave spoke as part of Asian Institute of Finance's Distinguished Speaker Series in 2014.  In addition, he has shown how leadership can impact investor value by creating a leadership capital index that can be used in private equity, investor relations, boards of directors, and other settings.  In the organization area, he has defined organizations as capabilities and written about culture change, learning, collaboration, change, and innovations in organization design.  His latest book with Arthur Yeung, Reinventing the Organization, redefines organizations as "market oriented ecosystems."

Bibliography
Books

Notes

References
New Jersey Human Resource Planning Group
Association of Knowledgework

External links

 Company Website

1953 births
Brigham Young University alumni
Human resource management people
Living people
People from Ely, Nevada
Ross School of Business faculty
Educators from Oregon
Writers from Kansas City, Missouri